The Enterprise station, also known as the Seaboard Coastline Depot is a historic train depot in Enterprise, Alabama. It was built in 1900 by the Alabama Midland Railway, which was eventually acquired by the Atlantic Coast Line Railroad. It now houses Enterprise Depot Museum. It was added to the National Register of Historic Places on August 7, 1974. It is located at the corner of Railroad Street and West College Street.

See also
National Register of Historic Places listings in Alabama

References

External links

Enterprise Depot Museum (Pea River Historical and Genealogical Society)

Railway stations on the National Register of Historic Places in Alabama
Railway stations in the United States opened in 1900
National Register of Historic Places in Coffee County, Alabama
Former Atlantic Coast Line Railroad stations
Transportation buildings and structures in Coffee County, Alabama
Former railway stations in Alabama